Nocardioides rubriscoriae is a rod-shaped bacterium from the genus Nocardioides which has been isolated from volcanic ash from a parasitic volcano in Jeju, Korea.

References

External links
Type strain of Nocardioides rubriscoriae at BacDive -  the Bacterial Diversity Metadatabase	

rubriscoriae
Bacteria described in 2014